Alonzo D. "Buster" Boone (January 13, 1908 – April 8, 1982) was an American baseball pitcher and manager in the Negro leagues. He played from 1929 to 1947 with several teams. Boone was involved in a car accident on September 7, 1942. Ulysses Brown and Smoky Owens died, while Boone, Eugene Bremmer, Herman Watts, and Wilbur Hayes were injured. From 1948 to 1950, Boone managed the Cleveland/St. Louis Buckeyes.

References

External links

 and Seamheads 
 
Obituary

1908 births
1982 deaths
Negro league baseball managers
Birmingham Black Barons players
Cleveland Bears players
Cleveland Buckeyes players
Cleveland Cubs players
Louisville Buckeyes players
Memphis Red Sox players
Baseball players from Alabama
Sportspeople from Decatur, Alabama
Baseball coaches from Alabama
20th-century African-American sportspeople
Baseball pitchers